Ustadgah is a Hindustani music school located in New Delhi. It was started by noted Sufi singer, Zila Khan. The school also helps talented students from underprivileged background to hone their singing skills.

History
The school was conceptualised in 2008 to impart Hindustani music training to students. And it started functioning from March 2010.

References

External links
 Official site

Music schools in India
New Delhi